is a Japanese female professional ten-pin bowler. She is a member of the Japan Professional Bowling Association, license no. 408.

At the end of the 2012 JPBA season, Nishimura was ranked second place in total points (only behind Hiromi Matsunaga.)

Nishimura is best known for her extremely high back swing and rolling the ball in-between the X and Y axis. Her recent accomplishments include appearing in the 2012 International Bowling Championships 2013 supported by DHC, bowling in an Baker-style exhibition match with a team of women from Japan, against a team of PBA Tour professionals, including Chris Barnes and Mike Fagan. The Japan women lost to the PBA Tour professionals 278-174.

Biography 
Nishimura's father is Kunihiko Nishimura (西村邦彦), who is also a professional bowler.

Major accomplishments  
 2006 - Rokko Queens (3rd place)
 2007 - Karuizawa Prince Cup (winner)
 2008 - Karuizawa Prince Cup (4th place)
 2008 - Rookie Battle　(2nd place)
 2010 - 27th Rokko Queens (4th place)
 2010 - 6th MK Charity Cup (4th place)
 2010 - Tokai Women's Open (4th place)
 2011 - 28th Rokko Queens (5th place)

P-League
 Tournament 19 - 3rd place
 Tournament 26 - winner
 Tournament 29 - 3rd place
 Tournament 30 - 2nd place
 Tournament 33 - 2nd place
 Tournament 35 - 2nd place
 Tournament 36 - winner
 Tournament 37 - 2nd place
 Tournament 38 - winner

Nishimura-pro currently holds the P-League record with seven straight semi-final match appearances.

References

External links 
 Profile @ DHC

1985 births
Living people
People from Osaka Prefecture
Japanese ten-pin bowling players